Tamyan (Tamyan) is a rural locality (a village) in Meleuzovsky Selsoviet, Meleuzovsky District, Bashkortostan, Russia. The population was 353 as of 2010. There are 15 streets.

Geography 
Tamyan is located 6 km south of Meleuz (the district's administrative centre) by road. Kuzminskoye is the nearest rural locality.

References 

Rural localities in Meleuzovsky District